A minder is a person who is assigned to watch over another person.

Minder may also refer to:

 Minder (surname)
 Minder (TV series), a 1979-1994 British television series and a 2009 revival of the original 
 Minder (video game), a 1985 video game created by Don Priestley, based on the British television series of the same name
 Minder the Golem, a female character in DC Comics' Forgotten Realms comic book series
 The Minder, a 2006 Argentine film
 The Minders, an American rock band